Hedi Beeler (born 20 November 1931) is a Swiss alpine skier. She competed in three events at the 1956 Winter Olympics.

References

External links
 

1931 births
Living people
Swiss female alpine skiers
Olympic alpine skiers of Switzerland
Alpine skiers at the 1956 Winter Olympics
Sportspeople from the canton of Schwyz
20th-century Swiss women